Elton Raymond Shaw (1886–1955) was a churchman, author and publisher, lecturer and educator, campaigner in the prohibition and temperance movement and a naturist.

Early life 
Shaw was born in Grand Rapids, Michigan, on 19 January 1886 to Rev'd Solomon Benjamin Shaw and Etta Ellen Sadler. He graduated from Ohio Wesleyan University with a double major in history and oratory and minors in English, political science and social science. Shaw led the debating team, was  president of the Prohibition League, and president of the Literary Society. In 1900 he was living with a widowed aunt and his cousins in Chicago, Illinois. By 1910, he was married and living in Grand Rapids with his wife Mable (née Bacon) and her parents.

Naturism 
In 1937 Elton published his book on nudism The Body Taboo: Its Origins, Effects and Modern Denial. He authored this work in Lansing, Michigan, and published out of new offices in Washington D.C.

In a Lansing State Journal article dated August 24, 1936, Shaw explained his interest in nudism began when he learned of the 1934 case of People vs. Ring. Shaw believed “famed Kalamazoo nudist leader, Fred Ring” had received a “raw deal” relating to his prosecution stemming from charges at an Allegan County nudist camp.

Shaw was also an opponent of the Comstock laws. He wrote the book What Shall We Do with the "Comstock" Law and the Post Office Censorship Power?.

Prohibition and Temperance 
Shaw wrote a number of books on this topic and was an office holder in various committees including the Prohibition State Committee of Michigan (and later for Ohio) and the Intercollegiate Prohibition Association.

Church work 
Shaw served in leadership roles in the Methodist Episcopal Church.

Publishing 
Shaw was president of Shaw Publishing Company (formerly S. B. Shaw, Publisher founded in 1893 by his father Solomon Shaw).

Publications 

 
 
 
 
 
 
  which was co-written with Wayne Wheeler

Notes and references

External links 
 Promotional Brochure

Censorship in the United States
Methodists from Michigan
Social nudity advocates
American temperance activists
American publishers (people)
1886 births
1955 deaths
American naturists